Actinium(III) sulfide is the radioactive compound of actinium with the formula Ac2S3. This salt was prepared by heating actinium(III) oxalate at 1400°C for 6 minutes in a mixture of carbon disulfide and hydrogen sulfide. The result was conformed to be actinium(III) sulfide by x-ray diffraction.

References

Actinium compounds
Sulfides